Khosh Bulduk is a rural locality in the Central Highlands Region, Queensland, Australia. 

References 

Central Highlands Region
Localities in Queensland